Jolene Marie Cholock-Rotinsulu (born May 15, 1996) is an Indonesian-American Paralympic Games committee member, disability rights activist, TV commercial model, actress, singer, and beauty pageant titleholder who won the title of Puteri Indonesia Lingkungan 2019. She represented Indonesia at the Miss International 2019 pageant at the Tokyo Dome City Hall in Tokyo, Japan where she finished as Top 8, continuing the ongoing 4th year placement streaks of Indonesia, consecutively since Felicia Hwang Yi Xin in 2016, Kevin Lilliana in 2017 and Vania Fitryanti in 2018.

Early life, education and career

Rotinsulu was born in Santa Ana, California to a Minahasan born father, Roy Guustaf Rotinsulu from Talaud, North Sulawesi, and an American mother, Allery Lee Cholock, from Los Angeles, California. Sirena Elizabeth Cholock-Rotinsulu, her older sister, was the past winner of Miss Celebrity Indonesia 2011. Rotinsulu holds a bachelor degree from Academy of Art University and Institut Agama Kristen Negeri (IAKN) Manado.

Rotinsulu has been a commercial model from age 10. She appeared on several music videos as a model and co-singer. She began her career as an actress by starring on the movie I AM HOPE (2016); a movie dedicated to cancer survivors. In addition, she obtained a certificate in outdoor recreation and an Indonesian national equestrian athlete for dressage disciplines in International Federation for Equestrian Sports.

Since 2017, Rotinsulu is an official member of the Asian Paralympic Committee for preparing 2018 Asian Para Games. She is known for receiving a Satyalancana Kebhaktian Sosial ("Social Welfare Medal") from the President of the Republic of Indonesia, Joko Widodo.

Activist background

Rotinsulu is a Disability rights activist who advocates for the elderly and people with disabilities, she built her own Nursing home care called "Saya Bisa", located in her hometown in Manado, that helped disabled elderly people with the movement of "1001 wheelchairs" and other physical disability support equipment. She also helped to develop the elderly skills with a project called "Du’Anyam", a forum to empower mothers and fathers to increase financial income by raising the culture of "weaving".

Rotinsulu works together with Ministry of Education and Culture of Indonesia, build a local NGO "Rumah Karya Sahabat Anak Grogol", a school that provides free education for the homeless and street children in Grogol District, Jakarta. In addition, Rotinsulu also helps the children in isolated remote area, where she built "Nisnde Papua Foundation" in Nduga Regency, Papua Province, a foundation to provide routine medical checkup, vaccination and mainly education in various subjects and technologies and General Insights.

Pageantry

Miss Celebrity Indonesia 2010 
Rotinsulu started her foray into the world of pageantry in 2010, at the age of fourteen where she joined the television celebrity beauty pageant contest Miss Celebrity Indonesia 2010 representing the city of Manado – North Sulawesi. The finale night was held in Jakarta, where she won 1st runner-up position and Miss Photogenic special award.

Puteri Indonesia 2019 
Rotinsulu was crowned as Puteri Indonesia Lingkungan 2019 (Miss International Indonesia 2019), at the grand finale held in Jakarta Convention Center, Jakarta on March 8, 2019 (International Women's Day) by the outgoing titleholder of Puteri Indonesia Lingkungan 2018 and Top-15 Miss International 2018, Vania Fitryanti Herlambang of Banten. She represented North Sulawesi province at the pageant and gained a special award as Puteri Indonesia of Sulawesi Islands.

The finale coronation night of Puteri Indonesia 2019 was also attended by the reigning Miss International 2018 – Mariem Claret Velazco García of Venezuela as a main Guest-star, and Miss International 2017, Kevin Lilliana Junaedy of Indonesia as a part of the selection committee. During her finale night speech for Puteri Indonesia 2019, Jolene successfully raised the awareness of a modern society effect topic, which is stereotypical beauty;

During her reign as Puteri Indonesia Lingkungan 2019, She was a speaker at United Nations Environment Programme – Global Landscapes Forum in New York City, United States on September 28, 2019.

Miss International 2019 
After being crowned as Puteri Indonesia Lingkungan 2019, Cholock-Rotinsulu represented Indonesia at the 59th edition of Miss International 2019 beauty pageant, in Tokyo, Japan which was held on 12 November 2019. Where she finished in the Top 8. Mariem Claret Velazco García of Venezuela crowned her successor Sireethorn Leearamwat of Thailand at the end of the pageant.

Filmography
Rotinsulu has appeared on several music videos as a model and singer. She has acted in several television and cinema film.

Movies

Television films

Television Shows

Music videos

Awards and nomination
Jolene received trophy for their contribution to Indonesian modeling and acting world.

See also 

 Puteri Indonesia 2019
 Miss International 2019
 Frederika Alexis Cull
 Jesica Fitriana Martasari

References

External links

 
 

Living people
1996 births
Puteri Indonesia winners
Miss International 2019 delegates
Paralympic Games
Indonesian disability rights activists
Academy of Art University alumni
Indonesian beauty pageant winners
Indonesian Christians
Indonesian female models
Indonesian television actresses
21st-century Indonesian actresses
21st-century Indonesian women singers
Actresses from Jakarta
Actresses from North Sulawesi
Actresses from Santa Ana, California
People from Manado
Indo people
Minahasa people
Indonesian people of Dutch descent
American people of Indonesian descent
American people of Dutch descent
American people of Dutch-Indonesian descent
American Christians